Warren Hill is a prominent elevation,  high, 1 kilometre southwest of the hamlet of Hooke, in the county of Dorset in southern England. Its prominence of  means it is listed as one of the Tumps. It is located within the Dorset Downs.

The summit is open, as is the hill's eastern flank, but much of the western side of the hill is covered by the woods of Hooke Park. Hooke Court lies just to the northeast. The Jubilee Trail passes Warren Hill just to the south and the Wessex Ridgeway just to the north.

References 

Hills of Dorset